Gafanha da Boa Hora is a village and a civil parish of the municipality of Vagos, Portugal. The population in 2011 was 2,625, in an area of 37.10 km2.

References

Freguesias of Vagos